The 28th 2017 Asian Baseball Championship was the international baseball competition for Asian men's national teams. It was held in Taipei and New Taipei, Taiwan on October 2–8, 2017. It was the 28th edition of the tournament.

Qualified teams
 – Host and 2nd place of the 2015 Asian Baseball Championship
 - 1st place at the 2015 Asian Baseball Championship
 – 3rd place at the 2015 Asian Baseball Championship
 – 4th place at the 2015 Asian Baseball Championship
 – 1st place at the 2017 West Asian Cup
 - 2nd place at the 2017 West Asian Cup
 - World Ranking 
 - World Ranking 

Notes

Group stage
The first stage would consist of each team playing against each other team in its group once. With the withdrawal of China, all games originally planned for China were considered forfeits and wins for the opposition.

Group A

NOTE: Tiebreaker notes: HTH − Head-to-head. RS − Runs scored. IPO − Innings the team batted. RA − Runs against. IPD − Innings the team pitched. TQB − The index of (RS/IPO)−(RA/IPD).

Korea vs Sri Lanka

Taiwan vs Philippines

Philippines vs Sri Lanka

Chinese Taipei vs Korea

Korea vs Philippines

Sri Lanka vs Taiwan

Group B

NOTE: Tiebreaker notes: HTH − Head-to-head. RS − Runs scored. IPO − Innings the team batted. RA − Runs against. IPD − Innings the team pitched. TQB − The index of (RS/IPO)−(RA/IPD).

Japan vs Hong Kong

Pakistan vs Japan

Hong Kong vs Pakistan

See also
 List of sporting events in Taiwan

References

Asian Baseball Championship
2017
2017 in Taiwanese sport
Asian Baseball Championship
2010s in Taipei
Sports competitions in Taipei
Sport in New Taipei